Robert Scott Jobe is a United States Air Force major general serving as the Director of Plans, Programs, and Requirements of the Air Combat Command since July 2021. Previously, he was the director of strategic plans of the United States Air Force. In February 2021, he was nominated for promotion to major general and assigned to become director of plans, programs, and requirements of the Air Combat Command, replacing Major General Case Cunningham.

References

External links

Year of birth missing (living people)
Living people
Place of birth missing (living people)
United States Air Force generals